The economy of the Democratic Republic of the Congo has declined drastically around the 1980s, despite being home to vast potential in natural resources and mineral wealth; their gross domestic product is $48.994 billion as of 2019.

At the time of its independence in 1960, the Democratic Republic of the Congo was the second most industrialized country in Africa after South Africa. It boasted a thriving mining sector and its agriculture sector was relatively productive. Since then, decades of corruption, war, and political instability have been a severe detriment to further growth, today leaving DRC with a GDP per capita and a HDI rating that rank among the world's lowest and make the DRC one of the most fragile and according to United Nations, least developed countries in the world.

Despite this the DRC is quickly modernizing; it tied with Malaysia for the largest positive change in HDI development in 2016. Government projects include strengthening the health system for maternal and child health, expansion of electricity access, water supply reconstructions, and urban and social rehabilitation programs.

Economic implications of conflicts
The two recent conflicts (the First and Second Congo Wars), which began in 1996, have dramatically reduced national output and government revenue, have increased external debt, and have resulted in deaths of more than five million people from war, and associated famine and disease. Malnutrition affects approximately two-thirds of the country's population.

Agriculture is the mainstay of the economy, accounting for 57.9% of GDP in 1997. In 1996, agriculture employed 66% of the work force.

Rich in minerals, the Democratic Republic of the Congo has a difficult history of predatory mineral extraction, which has been at the heart of many struggles within the country for many decades, but particularly in the 1990s. The economy of the second largest country in Africa relies heavily on mining. However, much economic activity occurs in the informal sector and is not reflected in GDP data.

In 2006 Transparency International ranked the Democratic Republic of the Congo 156 out of 163 countries in the Corruption Perception Index, tying Bangladesh, Chad, and Sudan with a 2.0 rating. President Joseph Kabila established the Commission of Repression of Economic Crimes upon his ascension to power in 2001.

The conflicts in the Democratic Republic of Congo were over water, minerals, and other resources. Political agendas have worsened the economy, as in times of crisis, the elite benefit while the general populace suffers. This is worsened as a result of corrupt national and international corporations. The corporations instigate and allow the fighting for resources because they benefit from it. A large proportion of fatalities in the country are attributed to a lack of basic services. The influx of refugees since the war in 1998 only serves to worsen the issue of poverty. Money of the taxpayers in the DRC is often misappropriated by the corrupt leaders of the country, who use the money to benefit themselves instead of the citizens of the DRC. The DRC is consistently rated the lowest on the UN Human Development Index.

Economic history

After Leopold 
Forced labor was important for the rural sector. The corporations that dominated the economy were mostly owned by Belgium, but British capital also played an important role. The 1950s were a period of rising income and expectations. Congo was said to have the best public health system in Africa, but there was also a huge wealth disparity. Belgian companies favored workers in certain areas more and exported them to work in different areas, restricting opportunities for others. Favored groups also received better education and were able to secure jobs for people in the same ethnic group which increased tensions. In 1960 there were only 16 university graduates out of a population of 20 million. Belgium still had economic power and independence gave little opportunity for improvement. Common refrains included "no elite, no trouble" and "before independence = after independence". When the Belgians left, most of the government officials and educated residents left with them. Before independence, there were just 3 out of 5000 government jobs held by Congolese people. The resulting loss of institutional knowledge and human capital crippled the government.

Zaire

After the Congo crisis, Mobutu arose as the country's sole ruler and stabilized the country politically. Economically, however, the situation continued to decline, and by 1979, the purchasing power was only 4% of that from 1960. Starting in 1976 the IMF provided stabilizing loans to the dictatorship. Much of the money was embezzled by Mobutu and his circle. This was not a secret as the 1982 report by IMF's envoy Erwin Blumenthal documented.  He stated, it is "alarmingly clear that the corruptive system in Zaire with all its wicked and ugly manifestations, its mismanagement and fraud will destroy all endeavors of international institutions, of friendly governments, and of the commercial banks towards recovery and rehabilitation of Zaire’s economy". Blumenthal indicated that there was "no chance"  that creditors would ever recover their loans. Yet the IMF and the World Bank continued to lend money that was either embezzled, stolen, or "wasted on elephant projects". "Structural adjustment programmes" implemented as a condition of IMF loans cut support for health care, education, and infrastructure.

1990s
Poor infrastructure, an uncertain legal framework, corruption, and lack of openness in government economic policy and financial operations remain a brake on investment and growth. A number of International Monetary Fund (IMF) and World Bank missions have met with the new government to help it develop a coherent economic plan but associated reforms are on hold.

Faced with continued currency depreciation, the government resorted to more drastic measures and in January 1999 banned the widespread use of American dollars for all domestic commercial transactions, a position it later adjusted. The government has been unable to provide foreign exchange for economic transactions, while it has resorted to printing money to finance its expenditure. Growth was negative in 2000 because of the difficulty of meeting the conditions of international donors, continued low prices of key exports, and post-coup instability.
Although depreciated, congolese francs have been stable for few years (Ndonda, 2014)

2000s
Conditions improved in late 2002 with the withdrawal of a large portion of the invading foreign troops. A number of IMF and World Bank missions have met with the government to help it develop a coherent economic plan, and President Kabila has begun implementing reforms.

DRC's economic growth decelerated from its pre-COVID level of 4.4% in 2019, to an estimated 0.8% in 2020. Growth was driven by the extractives sector which, helped by robust demand from China, expanded by 6.9% in 2020 (compared to 1% in 2019). Meanwhile, non-mining sectors contracted by 1.6% (vs. growth of 5.7% in 2019) due to pandemic-related mobility restrictions, weaker trading activities and constrained government spending. Private consumption and government investment fell in 2020 by an estimated 1.0 and 10.2%, respectively.

Special economic zones
The DRC is embarking on the establishment of special economic zones (SEZ) to encourage the revival of its industry. The first SEZ was planned to come into being in 2012 in N'Sele, a commune of Kinshasa, and will focus on agro-industries. The Congolese authorities also planned to open another zone dedicated to mining (Katanga) and a third dedicated to cement (in the Bas-Congo). There are three phases to the program that each have their own objectives. Phase I was the precursor to the actual investment in the Special Economic Zone where policymakers agreed to the framework, the framework was studied for its establishment, and to predict the potential market demand for the land. Stage one of Phase II involved submitting laws for the Special Economic Zone, finding good sites for businesses, and currently there is an effort to help the government attract foreign investment. Stage two of Phase II hasn't been started yet and it involves assisting the government in creating framework for the country, creating an overall plan for the site, figuring out what the environmental impact of the project will be, and guessing how much it will cost and what the return can be made on the investment. Phase III involves the World Bank creating a transaction phase that will keep everything competitive. The program is looking for options to hand over the program to the World Bank which could be very beneficial for the western part of the country.

Data 
The following table shows the main economic indicators in 1980–2017.

Economic implications of instability
Ongoing conflicts dramatically reduced government revenue and increased external debt. As Reyntjens wrote, "Entrepreneurs of insecurity are engaged in extractive activities that would be impossible in a stable state environment. The criminalization context in which these activities occur offers avenues for considerable factional and personal enrichment through the trafficking of arms, illegal drugs, toxic products, mineral resources and dirty money." Ethnic rivalries were made worse because of economic interests and looting and coltan smuggling took place. Illegal monopolies formed in the country where they used forced labor for children to mine or work as soldiers. National parks were overrun with people looking to exploit minerals and resources. Increased poverty and hunger from the war and that increased the hunting of rare wildlife. Education was denied when the country was under foreign control and very few people make money off the minerals in the country. The national resources are not the root cause for the continued fighting in the region, however, the competition has become an incentive to keep fighting.[1] The DRC's level of economic freedom is one of the lowest in the world, putting it in the repressed category. The armed militias fight with the government in the eastern section of the country over the mining sector or the corruption of the government, and weak policies lead to the instability of the economy. Human rights abuses also ruin economic activity; the DRC has a 7% unemployment rate, but still has one of the lowest GDP's per capita in the world. A major problem for people trying to start their own companies is that the minimum amount of capital needed to launch the company is five times the average annual income, and prices are regulated by the government, which almost forces people to have to work for the larger, more corrupt businesses; otherwise, they won't have work. It is hard for the DRC to encourage foreign trade because of the regulatory barriers.

International relations
Poor infrastructure, an uncertain legal framework, corruption, and lack of openness in government economic policy and financial operations remain a brake on investment and growth. A number of International Monetary Fund (IMF) and World Bank missions have met with the new government to help it develop a coherent economic plan but associated reforms are on hold.

Faced with continued currency depreciation, the government resorted to more drastic measures and in January 1999 banned the widespread use of U.S. dollars for all domestic commercial transactions, a position it later adjusted. The government has been unable to provide foreign exchange for economic transactions, while it has resorted to printing money to finance its expenditure. Growth was negative in 2000 because of the difficulty of meeting the conditions of international donors, continued low prices of key exports, and post-coup instability. 125 companies in 2003 contributed to the conflict in DRC showing the corruption.

World Bank
With the help of the International Development Association the DRC has worked toward the reestablishment of social services. This is done by giving 15 million people access to basic health services and giving bed nets to prevent malaria from spreading to people. With the Emergency Demobilization and Reintegration Program more than 107,000 adults and 34,000 child soldiers stood down their militarized posture. The travel time from Lubumbashi to Kasomeno in Katanga went down from seven days to two hours because of the improved roads which led to the decrease of prices of main goods by 60%. With the help of the IFC, KfW, and the EU the DRC improved its businesses by reducing the time it took to create a business by 51%, reducing the time it took to get construction permits by 54%, and reducing the number of taxes from 118 to 30. Improvements in health have been noticeable specifically that deliveries attended by trained staff jumped from 47 to 80%. In education 14 million textbooks were provided to children, completion rates of school have increased, and higher education was made available to students that chose to pursue it.

International Monetary Fund
The IMF plans on giving the DRC a $1 billion loan after its two-year suspension after it failed to give details about a mining deal from one of its state owned mines and an Israeli billionaire, Dan Gertler. The loan may be necessary for the country because there will be elections in December 2016 for the next president and the cost of funding this would range around $1.1 billion. The biggest problem with the vote is getting a country of 68 million people the size of Western Europe to polling stations with less than 1,860 miles of paved roads.

Sectors

Agriculture

Agriculture is the mainstay of the economy, accounting for 57.9% of the GDP in 1997. Main cash crops include coffee, palm oil, rubber, cotton, sugar, tea, and cocoa. Food crops include cassava, plantains, maize, groundnuts, and rice. In 1996, agriculture employed 66% of the work force.

The Democratic Republic of Congo produced, in 2018:

 29.9 million tons of cassava (3rd largest producer in the world, second only to Nigeria and Thailand);
 4.7 million tons of plantain (largest producer in the world);
 2 million tons of maize;
 1.1 million tons of palm oil;
 990 thousand tons of rice;
 384 thousand tons of sweet potato;
 309 thousand tons of banana;
 307 thousand tons of peanut;
 213 thousand tons of mango (including mangosteen and guava);
 213 thousand tons of papaya;
 205 thousand tons of beans;
 186 thousand tons of pineapple;
 168 thousand tons of orange;
 101 thousand tons of potato;

In addition to smaller productions of other agricultural products, such as coffee (29 thousand tons), cocoa (3.6 thousand tons), natural rubber (14 thousand tons) and tea (3.6 thousand tons).

Fishing
The Democratic Republic of Congo also possesses 50 percent of Africa's forests and a river system that could provide hydro-electric power to the entire continent, according to a United Nations report on the country's strategic significance and its potential role as an economic power in central Africa. Fish are the single most important source of animal protein in the DRC. Total production of marine, river, and lake fisheries in 2003 was estimated at 222,965 tons, all but 5,000 tons from inland waters. PEMARZA, a state agency, carries on marine fishing.

Forestry

Forests cover 60 percent of the total land area. There are vast timber resources, and commercial development of the country's 61 million hectares (150 million acres) of exploitable wooded area is only beginning. The Mayumbe area of Bas-Congo was once the major center of timber exploitation, but forests in this area were nearly
depleted. The more extensive forest regions of the central cuvette and of the Ubangi River valley have increasingly been tapped.

Roundwood removals were estimated at 72,170,000 m2 in 2003, about 95 percent for fuel. Some 14 species are presently being harvested. Exports of forest products in 2003 totalled $25.7 million. Foreign capital is necessary in order for forestry to expand, and the government recognizes that changes in tax structure and export procedures will be needed to facilitate economic growth.

Mining

Rich in minerals, the DRC has a difficult history of predatory mineral extraction, which has been at the heart of many struggles within the country for many decades, but particularly in the 1990s. Although the economy of the Democratic Republic of the Congo, the second largest country in Africa who has historically relied heavily on mining, is no longer reflected in the GDP data as the mining industry has suffered from long-term "uncertain legal framework, corruption, and a lack of transparency in government policy." The informal sector .

In her book entitled The Real Economy of Zaire, MacGaffey described a second, often illegal economy, "system D", which is outside the official economy (MacGaffey 1991:27). and therefore is not reflected in the GDP.

Exploitation of mineral substances by companies
The economy of the second largest country in Africa relies heavily on mining. The Congo is the world's largest producer of cobalt ore, and a major producer of copper and industrial diamonds. The Congo has 70% of the world's coltan, and more than 30% of the world's diamond reserves., mostly in the form of small, industrial diamonds. The coltan is a major source of tantalum, which is used in the fabrication of electronic components in computers and mobile phones. In 2002, tin was discovered in the east of the country, but, to date, mining has been done on a small scale. Manono in Central DRC has a significant deposit of lithium and tin with tantalum and niobium and is being developed by an Australian company. Production is expected in 2023.

Smuggling of the conflict minerals, coltan and cassiterite (ores of tantalum and tin, respectively), has helped fuel the war in the Eastern Congo.

Today's larger mining companies are making changes and adhering to global demand for ESG ( Environmental, Social and Governance) and IRMA (Initiative for Responsible Mining Assurance). One such globally recognised certification is the 3T iTSCi, the only widely implemented and accepted mineral traceability and due diligence system in the region for the 3T minerals – Tin, Tantalum and Tungsten, an internationally recognised certification for responsible mining and traceability under the 2010 Dodd-Frank Act. Today four central African countries including the Democratic Republic of Congo (DRC) provides legitimate and ethical 3T minerals. ITSCI is the only industry initiative with standards 100% aligned with the OECD Guidance. Much has been done in the last 15 years, providing artisanal and small-scale miners a support network through iTSCi, to build the foundations and regulate the industry. At the end of 2019 ITSCI has seen to 2000 mines, employment of around 80,000 miners, and the supply of over 2000 tonnes of tin, tantalum and tungsten minerals per month; the initiative has come a long way in the last decade. A report had been done by Pact in 2015, detailing iTSCi's progress over the previous five years, it discusses the successes, the challenges ahead and the work yet to be done. Entitled Unconflicted: Making Conflict-Free Mining a Reality in the DRC, Rwanda and Burundi.

Copper and cobalt
Katanga Mining Limited, a London-based company, owns the Luilu Metallurgical Plant, which has a capacity of 175,000 tonnes of copper and 8,000 tonnes of cobalt per year, making it the largest cobalt refinery in the world. After a major rehabilitation program, the company restarted copper production in December 2007 and cobalt production in May 2008.

Informal sector
Much economic activity occurs in the informal sector and is not reflected in GDP data.

Transport

Ground transport in the Democratic Republic of Congo has always been difficult. The terrain and climate of the Congo Basin present serious barriers to road and rail construction, and the distances are enormous across this vast country. Furthermore, chronic economic mismanagement and internal conflict has led to serious under-investment over many years.

On the other hand, the Democratic Republic of Congo has thousands of kilometres of navigable waterways, and traditionally water transport has been the dominant means of moving around approximately two-thirds of the country.

See also

Democratic Republic of the Congo
List of companies based in the Democratic Republic of the Congo
Mining industry of the Democratic Republic of the Congo
United Nations Economic Commission for Africa

References

External links
 
 
 
 Democratic Republic of the Congo latest trade data on ITC Trade Map
 Dias, Elizabeth (24 July 2009). "First Blood Diamonds, Now Blood Computers?". Time. 
 Oasis Kodila Tedika et Francklin Kyayima Muteba, The sources of growth in DRC before independence. A cointegration analysis, CRE Working paper, n°02/10, juin 2010
 Exenberger, Andreas/Hartmann, Simon (2007): The Dark Side of Globalization. The Vicious Cycle of Exploitation from World Market Integration: Lesson from the Congo, Working Papers in Economics and Statistics 31-2007
 

 
Congo, Democratic Republic of the
Congo, Democratic Republic of the